Musović is a Serbo-Croatian surname. Notable people with the surname include:

Tafil Musović, Serbian painter
Miljana Bojović (née Musović, born 1987), Serbian basketball player

See also
Mušović

Serbian surnames
Patronymic surnames